The  is a Shinto shrine and one of Tenmangū founded in AD 949 in Osaka.  The Tenjin Festival is held here annually from 24 July to 25 July.

Nearest stations
Ōsakatemmangū Station on the West Japan Railway Company (JR West) JR Tōzai Line
Minami-morimachi Station on the two lines of Osaka Municipal Subway.
Beppyo shrines

References

Osaka Convention & Tourism Bureau - Osaka Temmangu Shrine

Sugawara no Michizane
Kita-ku, Osaka
Shinto shrines in Osaka
10th-century establishments in Japan
Religious buildings and structures completed in 949

Tenjin faith